The 1977 Richmond Spiders football team was an American football team that represented the University of Richmond as an independent during the 1977 NCAA Division I football season. In their fourth season under head coach Jim Tait, Richmond compiled a 3–8 record.

Schedule

References

Richmond
Richmond Spiders football seasons
Richmond Spiders